Cheena Marie Lo is a poet working in Oakland, California, and a graduate of Mills College. They were born in the Philippines. Lo identifies as genderqueer. Cheena Marie Lo is a founding editor, along with Tessa Micaela Landreau-Grasmuck and Zoe Tuck, of HOLD: a journal.

Publications
"NO FILTER" (Aggregate Space 2014)
"Ephemera & Atmospheres" (Belladonna* Collaborative 2014)
"It's night in San Francisco but it's sunny in Oakland" (Timeless, Infinite Light 2014)
A Series of Un/Natural/Disasters, Commune Papers 2016. 978-1934639191

Notes

References

External links
 HOLD: a journal

Filipino non-binary people
Mills College alumni
Filipino poets
Year of birth missing (living people)
Living people
Non-binary writers
21st-century LGBT people